Thomas Christopher Porter (25 October 1885 – 4 June 1915) was an English amateur footballer who played in the Football League for Stockport County and Glossop as an inside forward. He scored 7 goals in 4 appearances for England Amateurs, including two hat-tricks in a 9–0 win against Germany, which still is the team's highest defeat of its history, and against France in a 11–0 victory. He scored a further 5 goals for the Amateurs side in unofficial matches, a brace in a 5–1 win over Ireland in 1908 and yet another hat-trick in a 6–0 win over Wales in 1909, bringing his tally to 12 goals. He was also part of Great Britain's squad for the football tournament at the 1908 Summer Olympics, but he did not play in any matches. Porter also played cricket for Broughton and Lancashire's second XI.

Personal life 
Porter attended Manchester Grammar School and later worked at the Horwich depot of the Lancashire and Yorkshire Railway. He enlisted as a private in the Manchester Regiment during the First World War and was killed at Gallipoli on 4 June 1915. Porter is commemorated on the Helles Memorial.

Career statistics

International goals
England Amateurs score listed first, score column indicates score after each Porter goal.

References

1885 births
1915 deaths
Footballers from Stockport
English footballers
England amateur international footballers
Association football inside forwards
Northern Nomads F.C. players
Stockport County F.C. players
Glossop North End A.F.C. players
English Football League players
British Army personnel of World War I
Manchester Regiment soldiers
British military personnel killed in World War I
People educated at Manchester Grammar School
English cricketers
Footballers at the 1908 Summer Olympics